Photogrammetry is the technique to extract geometric information from two-dimensional images or video.

Comparison of notable packages

See also 
MicMac (software)
PCI Geomatica
Bundle adjustment software
Structure from motion software

References 

Photogrammetry software